Uberto De Morpurgo (12 January 1896 – 26 February 1961) was a male tennis player from Italy.

Uberto De Morpurgo was born in Trieste when it was part of Austria, but became an  Italian citizen when the city changed hands after World War I. His world rankings were ninth in 1928, tenth in 1929, and eighth in 1930. Bill Tilden ranked him 10th in the world in 1924, and 6th in 1929.

Tennis career
De Morpurgo was junior champion in Great Britain in 1911, and student champion in Paris in 1915. He was ranked as Italy's top tennis player in 1927, and again in 1929 through 1931. Tennis magazine called him "the Tilden of his country". De Morpurgo reached the semifinals of the 1930 French championships (beating Edgar Moon before losing to Henri Cochet).

He was named Italian Commissioner of Tennis by Benito Mussolini in 1929.

Olympics
De Morpurgo participated in the singles event at the 1924 Summer Olympics in Paris. He won his first four matches to reach the semifinal which he lost to eventual gold medal winner Vincent Richards in four sets. De Morpurgo won the bronze medal after a five-set victory in the play-off against Jean Borotra of France.

Davis Cup
De Morpurgo played on Italy's Davis Cup team each year from its inaugural year in 1922 through 1933.  He won 39 singles matches and lost 14, while in doubles he was 16–10.

Playing style
De Morpurgo used a very fast serve on his first ball, and an exaggerated American Twist serve on the second serve which was of extreme contortion. His baseline game consisted of flat drives. He had an excellent net attack, owing to his great reach. His overhead, like his service, was hard but erratic.

Recognition
De Morpurgo, who was Jewish, was inducted as a member of the International Jewish Sports Hall of Fame in 1993.

Grand Slam finals

Mixed doubles (1 runners-up)

Career finals

Singles (1 win 2 runner-ups)

See also
 List of select Jewish tennis players
 Morpurgo

References

External links 
 
 
 
 
 
 Umberto Louis de Morpurgo at JewishSports.net
 

1896 births
1961 deaths
Italian male tennis players
Jewish tennis players
Olympic tennis players of Italy
Olympic bronze medalists for Italy
Tennis players at the 1924 Summer Olympics
20th-century Italian Jews
Austro-Hungarian Jews
Italian Austro-Hungarians
Italian nobility
Austrian nobility
Sportspeople from Trieste
People from Austrian Littoral
Olympic medalists in tennis
Medalists at the 1924 Summer Olympics